Fred Walton may refer to:

 Fred Walton (actor) (1865–1936), English-American actor
 Fred Walton (director), American film director and screenwriter